Negativicoccus succinicivorans is a Gram-positive and anaerobic bacterium from the genus of Negativicoccus which has been isolated from a human toe wound in France.

References

 

Negativicutes
Bacteria described in 2010